Stanley Edwin Daniels (July 31, 1934 – April 6, 2007) was a Canadian-American screenwriter, producer and director, who won eight Emmy Awards for his work on The Mary Tyler Moore Show and Taxi.

Early life
Born in Toronto to Jewish parents involved in vaudeville, Daniels earned a bachelor's degree and master's degree from the University of Toronto, then began studying for a doctorate from Oxford University. His first television writing job was for The Dean Martin Show in 1965. There, he met his writing partner Ed. Weinberger.

Career
Daniels's influence in comedy is noted by the joke setup that is credited to him ("Stan Daniels turn") wherein "a character says something and then does an immediate 180-degree shift on what he just said," according to The Simpsons producer Al Jean. Daniels composed the music and wrote the lyrics for the 1976 musical So Long, 174th Street.

Death
Daniels was diagnosed with frontotemporal dementia a few years prior to his death. He died of a heart attack in Encino, California.

Filmography

Director
 Best of the West (1 episode, 1981)
 Taxi (1 episode, 1982)
 Mr. Smith (Unknown episodes, 1983)
 Dear John (5 episodes, 1988–1989)
 Flying Blind (2 episodes, 1993)
 Almost Perfect (Unknown episodes, 1995)
 High Society (1 episode, 1995)
 Partners (1 episode, 1996)
 Sparks (3 episodes, 1996–1997)
 Good News (4 episodes, 1997)

Producer
 The Mary Tyler Moore Show (Unknown episodes, 1970)
 Doc (Executive producer, 1 episode, 1976)
 The Betty White Show (Executive producer, unknown episodes, 1977)
 Cindy (1978)
 Taxi (Executive producer, unknown episodes)
 The Associates (Executive producer, unknown episodes)
 Glory! Glory! (1989)
 For Richer, for Poorer (Supervising producer, 1992)
 The Kid (Executive producer, 2001)

Writer
 The Dean Martin Show (1 episode, 1965)
 The Bill Cosby Show (1 episode, 1970)
 Gene Kelly's Wonderful World of Girls (1970)
 Lily (1970)
 Phyllis (Unknown episodes)
 The Mary Tyler Moore Show (12 episodes, 1973–1977)
 Cindy (1978)
 Taxi (3 episodes, 1978)
 The Associates (13 episodes, 1979)
 Mr. Smith (5 episodes, 1983)
 The Lonely Guy (1984)
 Glory! Glory! (1989)
 Getting There (1990)
 Roc (1 episode, 1991)
 Daniels wrote Roc'''s pilot episode, and was credited throughout the series' three-season run as creator.
 Faith (1991)
 For Richer, for Poorer (1992)
 The Substitute Wife (1994)
 The Kid'' (2001)

Awards and nominations

References

External links

1934 births
2007 deaths
American film producers
American male screenwriters
American television directors
American television producers
Canadian emigrants to the United States
Emmy Award winners
Jewish American writers
Jewish Canadian writers
Writers from Toronto
20th-century American male writers
20th-century American screenwriters
20th-century American Jews
21st-century American Jews